Mathias Röthenmund (born 22 October 1974) is a Swiss slalom canoeist who competed in the 1990s and 2000s.

He won the gold medal in the K1 team event at the 2003 ICF Canoe Slalom World Championships in Augsburg. He also won 4 medals at the European Championships (1 gold, 1 silver and 2 bronzes). Röthenmund also finished ninth in the K1 event at the 2000 Summer Olympics in Sydney.

Former American slalom canoeist Cathy Hearn is his sister-in-law.

World Cup individual podiums

References

1974 births
Canoeists at the 2000 Summer Olympics
Living people
Olympic canoeists of Switzerland
Swiss male canoeists
Medalists at the ICF Canoe Slalom World Championships